NATM usually refers to the New Austrian Tunnelling method.

NATM may also refer to:

Not Another Teen Movie
Night at the Museum, a 2006 film